The Cambridge School of Bucharest (CSB) is an international British School Overseas (BSO) located in Bucharest, Romania. Headquartered in Voluntari, Romania, CSB operates under the flagship of Fundația Mateas.

Overview 
CSB is an accredited British School Overseas (BSO) by the UK Department for Education, a member of the Council of British International Schools, and the Association of British Schools Overseas. It is a UK National Online Safety certified school and has been recognized by the UK Safeguarding Alliance for excellent practice in child protection during the COVID-19 pandemic.

CSB is divided into six sections grouped according to year, including EYFS-Kindergarten, lower primary, upper primary, lower secondary, upper secondary, and sixth form. During the COVID-19 pandemic, the school implemented digital solutions for IGCSE, AS, and A-level programs. Additionally, CSB used its social media platforms to participate in the Chase The Rainbow campaign, started fundraising activities with a local business to support medical personnel, and participated in the Getty Museum Art Challenge.

History 
Since 2002, CSB is licensed by Cambridge University as an official exam center for Cambridge Assessments International Education (CAIE) examinations.

In September 2020, CSB moved to its 35 million euro campus in the Bucharest suburb of Pipera.  It accommodates up to 1,400 students, offering a host of sports and creative activities.

Notable alumni 

 Tobi Ibitoye

References 

International schools in Bucharest